William Alexander Watson Sheldon (18 January 1907 – 1 November 1999) was an Irish politician and farmer. He was elected to Dáil Éireann at the 1943 general election as a Clann na Talmhan Teachta Dála (TD) for the Donegal East constituency. He was re-elected as an independent TD at the 1944, 1948, 1951, 1954 and 1957 general elections. He did not contest the 1961 general election. 

When tributes were paid to him in the Seanad after his death, it was said that this was because the constituency was reduced from 4 to 3 seats. In 1961, he was nominated by the Taoiseach, Seán Lemass to the 10th Seanad. He was re-nominated to the Seanad in 1965 and 1969, and he retired from politics in 1973. He was also a member of Donegal County Council from 1945 to 1955.

Notes

References

1907 births
1999 deaths
Clann na Talmhan TDs
Independent TDs
Irish farmers
Members of the 11th Dáil
Members of the 12th Dáil
Members of the 13th Dáil
Members of the 14th Dáil
Members of the 15th Dáil
Members of the 16th Dáil
Members of the 10th Seanad
Members of the 11th Seanad
Members of the 12th Seanad
Politicians from County Donegal
Nominated members of Seanad Éireann
Independent members of Seanad Éireann